"At Long Last Love" is a popular song written by Cole Porter, for his 1938 musical You Never Know, where it was introduced by Clifton Webb.

Other recordings
Nancy Wilson, Gentle Is My Love, 1965

References

Songs written by Cole Porter
Frank Sinatra songs
Lena Horne songs
Ella Fitzgerald songs
1938 songs
Songs from Cole Porter musicals